"Road to Joy" is the last song on Bright Eyes' 2005 album I'm Wide Awake, It's Morning. It was written by Conor Oberst. The name of the album is taken from a lyric in the song.

Structure
The song begins with a fingerpicking section combined with an interpolation of a melody strongly based on Beethoven's Symphony No. 9. As the song progresses, it builds into a march, with the introduction of trumpets and horns. Near the end, everything fades out as Oberst delivers the final verse, and then all of the instruments come in at once in a loud frenzy, and continue for about 30–45 seconds before fading out and ending the album.

Live performances
The song is a staple of Bright Eyes' live performances, and is often played as a concert finale. After performing the song on The Late Late Show with Craig Ferguson, Oberst and trumpeter Nate Walcott destroyed their instruments.

Personnel
Conor Oberst – guitar, vocals
Mike Mogis – 12-string guitar
Nate Walcott – trumpet
Clark Baechle – drums
Matt Maginn – bass
Alex McManus – guitar
Nick White – organ

See also
 List of anti-war songs

2005 songs
Bright Eyes (band) songs
Songs written by Conor Oberst